616 (six hundred [and] sixteen) is the natural number following 615 and preceding 617.

While 666 is called the "number of the beast" in most manuscripts of Revelation , a fragment of the earliest papyrus 115 gives the number as 616.

In mathematics
616 is a member of the Padovan sequence, coming after 265, 351, 465 (it is the sum of the first two of these). 616 is a polygonal number in four different ways: it is a heptagonal number, as well as 13-, 31- and 104-gonal.

It is also the sum of the squares of the factorials of 2,3,4: (2!)² + (3!)² + (4!)² = 4+36+576=616.

The 616th harmonic number is the first to exceed seven.

Number of the beast

666 is generally believed to have been the original Number of the Beast in the Book of Revelation in the Christian Bible. In 2005, however, a fragment of papyrus 115 was revealed, containing the earliest known version of that part of the Book of Revelation discussing the Number of the Beast. It gave the number as 616, suggesting that this may have been the original.  One possible explanation for the two different numbers is that they reflect two different spellings of Emperor Nero/Neron's name, for which (according to this theory) this number is believed to be a code.

In other fields
 Earth-616 is the name used to identify the primary continuity in which most Marvel Comics' titles take place.
 616 film, a medium film format.
 Area code 616, an area code in Michigan.

References

Integers